Liga Deportiva Estudiantil is an association football club based in Guayaquil, Ecuador, founded on June 20, 1929.

External links
 Liga Deportiva Estudiantil, Asociación de Fútbol del Guayas.

Football clubs in Ecuador
Sport in Guayaquil